Sebo Shahbazian (born September 25, 1980 in Iran) is a retired Iranian football player who usually played as a defender. He played for the IPL club Saba Battery FC during the 2006–2007 season.

Club career
Shahbazian started his career at the Tehran side Pas Tehran before moving to Iranian Giants Esteghlal FC. In 2006 Shahbazian was transferred to Saba Battery FC.

References 

1980 births
Living people
Iranian people of Armenian descent
Iranian footballers
Esteghlal F.C. players
Association football defenders